A Bachelor of Technology (Latin Baccalaureus Technologiae; B.Tech) is an undergraduate academic degree conferred after the completion of a three to five-year program of studies at an accredited university or accredited higher education institution, such as a college or university.

Australia
In Australia, the Bachelor of Technology (BTech) degree is offered by RMIT University, Edith Cowan University, Curtin University and certain private institutions.

Singapore
In Singapore, the degree is offered by National University of Singapore under NUS SCALE programmes.

United States
In New York State, the degree is offered by the New York City College of Technology, part of City University of New York. Multiple academic departments of the college offers course resulting in the degree upon graduation.

References
 

Technology, Bachelor of
Engineering education